Events from the year 1756 in Russia

Incumbents
 Monarch – Elizabeth I

Events

 Foundation of the Imperial Theatres

Births

Deaths

 
 
 

 19 March - Maria Choglokova, courtier (born 1723)
 Aksinya Sergeeva

References

1756 in Russia
Years of the 18th century in the Russian Empire